1012 Sarema (prov. designation:  or ) is a dark background asteroid from the inner regions of the asteroid belt, approximately  kilometers in diameter. It was discovered on 12 January 1924, by German astronomer Karl Reinmuth at the Heidelberg-Königstuhl State Observatory at Heidelberg, Germany. The asteroid has a rotation period of 10.3 hours and probably an elongated shape. It was named after Sarema, a character in the poem The Fountain of Bakhchisaray by Aleksandr Pushkin, and the protagonist of the opera Sarema by Alexander von Zemlinsky based upon it.

Orbit and classification 

Sarema is a non-family asteroid of the main belt's background population when applying the hierarchical clustering method to its proper orbital elements. Based on osculating Keplerian orbital elements, the asteroid has also been classified as a member of the Nysa family, the largest asteroid family of the main belt, consisting of stony and carbonaceous subfamilies. The family, named after 44 Nysa, is located in the inner belt near the Kirkwood gap (3:1 orbital resonance with Jupiter), a depleted zone that separates the central main belt.

It orbits the Sun in the inner asteroid belt at a distance of 2.1–2.8 AU once every 3 years and 11 months (1,426 days; semi-major axis of 2.48 AU). Its orbit has an eccentricity of 0.13 and an inclination of 4° with respect to the ecliptic.

Naming 

This minor planet was named after a character in a poem by Aleksandr Pushkin, made into the opera Sarema by Alexander von Zemlinsky. The official naming citation was mentioned in The Names of the Minor Planets by Paul Herget in 1955. The asteroid's name was suggested by Russian astronomer Nikolaj Komendantov (also see ).

Physical characteristics 

In the Tholen classification, Sarema is an uncommon F-type asteroid of the carbonaceous C-complex.

Rotation period and poles 

In April 1983, a first rotational lightcurve of Sarema was obtained from photometric observations by American astronomer Richard Binzel. Lightcurve analysis gave a well-defined rotation period of 10.32 hours with a brightness amplitude of 0.81 magnitude, which is indicative for an elongated, non-spherical shape.

In 2009 and 2011, two modeled lightcurves gave a concurring sidereal period 10.30708 hours, combining sparse and dense photometric data from the Uppsala Asteroid Photometric Catalogue and other sources. The two studies also determined two spin axis of (45.0°, 67.0°) and (253.0°, 63.0°), as well as (51.0°, 64.0°) and (254.0°, 53.0°) in ecliptic coordinates (λ, β), respectively.

Diameter and albedo 

According to the surveys carried out by the Infrared Astronomical Satellite IRAS, the Japanese Akari satellite and the NEOWISE mission of NASA's Wide-field Infrared Survey Explorer, Sarema measures between 16.06 and 22.96 kilometers in diameter and its surface has an albedo between 0.0342 and 0.07. The Collaborative Asteroid Lightcurve Link derives an albedo of 0.045 and a diameter of 21.13 kilometers based on an absolute magnitude of 12.36.

References

External links 
 Asteroid Lightcurve Database (LCDB), query form (info )
 Dictionary of Minor Planet Names, Google books
 Asteroids and comets rotation curves, CdR – Observatoire de Genève, Raoul Behrend
 Discovery Circumstances: Numbered Minor Planets (1)-(5000) – Minor Planet Center
 Shape models of asteroids, 3D Asteroid Catalogue
 
 

001012
Discoveries by Karl Wilhelm Reinmuth
Alexander Pushkin
Named minor planets
001012
19240112